Nothing Venture is a 1948 British comedy family film directed by John Baxter and starring The Artemus Boys, Terry Randall, Patric Curwen and Michael Aldridge.

Cast
 The Artemus Boys as Themselves
 Terry Randall as Diana Chaice  
 Patric Curwen as The Author  
 Michael Aldridge as Michael Garrod  
 Paul Blake as The Boss  
 Wilfrid Caithness as The Professor  
 Howard Douglas as Badger  
 Ben Williams as Spike  
 Peter Gawthorne as Scotland Yard Official  
 Jack Simpson and His Sextet as Themselves
 Ronne Coyles as Boy  
 Arthur Denton  as Hotel Porter  
 Alfred Harris  as Hotel Guest  
 Maureen Morton as Singer

References

Bibliography
 Murphy, Robert. Directors in British and Irish Cinema: A Reference Companion. British Film Institute, 2006.

External links

1948 films
British comedy films
1948 comedy films
1940s English-language films
Films directed by John Baxter
British black-and-white films
1940s British films